Elsie Cook was the secretary for the Scottish Women’s Football Association when it was formed.  Cook's advocacy for women's football in Scotland helped the ban on the sport get reversed and led to Scotland playing their first team game against England.

Coaching career

Cook coached Stewarton Thistle to the first Women's FA Cup final in 1971. Cook briefly coached the Scotland women's national football team.

References

Women's association football defenders
Scotland women's national football team managers
Living people
F.C. Kilmarnock Ladies players
Scottish women's footballers
Women's association football managers
Scottish sports executives and administrators
Year of birth missing (living people)